The Further Chronicles of Conan is a collection of fantasy novels written by Robert Jordan featuring the sword and sorcery hero Conan the Barbarian, created by Robert E. Howard.  The book was first published in hardcover in October 1999 by Tor Books, with a trade paperback edition following in September 2004 from the same publisher. It collects three novels previously published by Tor.

Contents
 Conan the Magnificent
 Conan the Triumphant
 Conan the Victorious

Reception
Reviewer Bob Byrne writes that "it seems to be generally agreed that Jordan's works are among the best of the non-Howard efforts (of course, some will disagree)." In his own reading of the collection, "this Conan is not the comedian-ish version portrayed by Ah-nuld S. in the two movies, and "a bit more of the noble savage and less of the wild barbarian than I expected." He finds Jordan's writing "nicely descriptive without being quite as wordy as he grew to be in the latter half of the Wheel of Time series."

Notes

1999 novels
American fantasy novels
Conan the Barbarian books
Tor Books books